Handwritten is the debut studio album by Canadian singer Shawn Mendes, released on April 14, 2015, by Island. It debuted at number one on the US Billboard 200 with first-week sales of 119,000 album-equivalent units, of which 106,000 copies were pure album sales, becoming the tenth artist to chart under the age of 18. The album includes "Stitches", which reached top 5 on the US Billboard Hot 100 and number one on the UK Singles Chart. The album's reissue, Handwritten Revisited features the US top 20 single "I Know What You Did Last Summer". To promote the album, Mendes performed in several television shows and awards. Two concert tours were also supported by the album: ShawnsFirstHeadlines and Shawn Mendes World Tour.

Background
After signing a record deal with Island Records in June 2014, Mendes released his debut single "Life of the Party" which peaked at number 24 on the US Billboard Hot 100. Following the single release, an EP titled The Shawn Mendes EP was released on July 28, 2014, and sold 48,000 copies in its first week. Mendes announced his debut album title and artwork on January 27, 2015, and it was made available to pre-order on February 2, 2015.

Handwritten was reissued in a revisited edition on November 20, 2015. It includes five live recordings tracks from the Greek Theatre and four brand new songs.

Singles

"Life of the Party", was released as the lead single from Mendes debut EP The Shawn Mendes EP on 25 June 2014. The song serves as the first single from Handwritten as well. A one-shot lyric video for the song showing Mendes in the George Street diner premiered on Vevo on June 30, 2014. The official music video for the song premiered on March 10, 2015.

"Something Big", was released as the album's second single on November 7, 2014. The official music video for the song premiered on November 11, 2014, on Vevo, and it is Mendes' first official music video.

"Stitches", was released as the album's third and final single on May 5, 2015. The song debuted on the Billboard Hot 100 chart of June 13, 2015, at number 89 and became his first top 10, peaking at number 4. It also peaked at No. 1 in the UK Singles Chart in January 2016 and became Mendes' first UK chart-topper.

"I Know What You Did Last Summer", was released as a single from a revisited edition of the album on November 18, 2015. The song is a collaboration with Cuban-American singer Camila Cabello. It has peaked at number 20 on the Billboard Hot 100 chart. In the UK the song peaked at number 42.

Other songs
Before the album release, Mendes released five songs through pre-order on iTunes. The first song "A Little Too Much", was released on February 2, the same day the album pre-order started. A music video for the song premiered on the singer's Vevo on February 4. Mendes announced through Instagram that the second promotional song would be "Never Be Alone" and it was made available on February 16. An official music video for the song was released on February 25. On March 16 the singer released "Stitches", the third pre-order single, which official music video premiered on March 18. An acoustic version of "Life of the Party", featured in the deluxe version of the album, was released as the fourth pre-order single on March 30 at midnight, the same day as it was made possible to hear every song preview on iTunes. "Kid in Love", was made available as the fifth and final pre-order track on April 6 at midnight, just a week before the album release, while a music video for the acoustic version of "Life of the Party", was posted on Shawn Mendes' Vevo on April 10. "Aftertaste" also gained a music video, which was posted on April 17.

Commercial performance
The album debuted at number one on the US Billboard 200, selling 119,000 album-equivalent units in its first week, of which 106,000 copies were pure album sales. He became the youngest artist since Justin Bieber to have a No. 1 album on the Billboard 200 album chart in nearly five years. Bieber was 16 years and 2 months old when his album My World 2.0 spent its fourth and final week at the top. Mendes was 16 years and 8 months old. In its second week, the album descended to number seventeen with 20,000 equivalent album units, of which 12,000 copies were pure album sales, an 89% pure album sales decrease (from 106,000 copies), surpassing Madonna's MDNA (2012) for the biggest second-week percentage drop for a number-one debuting album in the Nielsen SoundScan era. As of August 2016, Handwritten has sold 391,000 copies in the United States.

In his native Canada, the album debuted at number one with first-week sales of 14,000 copies, according to Nielsen SoundScan. In its second week, the album descended to number six.

Critical reception

Handwritten received mixed reviews from music critics. At Metacritic, which assigns a "weighted average" rating out of 100 from selected independent ratings and reviews from mainstream critics, the album received a Metascore of 58, based on five reviews.

Billboard'''s editor Carl Wilson called Handwriten "a promising teen's first album" but ended his review by opining that "so far, though, Mendes' music is not nearly as inventive as his strategies to publicize it." Lewis Corner of Digital Spy felt that the record was at its best "when Mendes veers slightly away from the soppy sentiments" and that "his vocal tone is clear and distinct, and the songs are packed with hooks and heart" but that "he faces a challenge ahead of him to convince a broader audience, and there are moments here that fall short of that," ending his review by opining that the album is "a sturdy enough foundation to ensure he doesn't disappear just as quickly." Writing for The Guardian, Caroline Sullivan rated the album three-out-of-five stars and claims: "At 16, Mendes isn’t the artist he’ll be at 25, but he’s made a persuasive start – the adult-pop big league could yet be his."

Glenn Gamboa of Newsday felt that the album "goes well beyond what you'd expect from your average teen sensation" and that "he tackles a wide range of styles and topics and handles them all well." Jim Farber of NY Daily News complimented Mendes' overall look and sound and wrote that "a bright future for Mendes seems guaranteed." Nick Murray from Rolling Stone described Mendes as a "nice-guy guitar strummer more influenced by the light acoustic pop of Ed Sheeran." Writing for USA Today, Brian Mansfield opined that the album "has the simplicity and vulnerability of a carefully folded love note passed surreptitiously in class" while noting that he "aches to be more than ordinary."

In a more negative review, Christina Lee of Idolator wrote that Handwritten "has its tiny moments of spark, but it also gets dull because of how self-serious he is" and that it "seems like he’s afraid to overstep any boundaries" while also writing that "if he hadn’t already invited fans into his world, he’d have to try harder with his music to captivate them," although she did specifically compliment "Life of the Party," "Stitches," and "I Don't Even Know Your Name." Writing for AllMusic, Stephen Erlewin criticized the songwriting and production while writing that Mendes had enough time "to learn how to engage a listener for at least 60 seconds, but Handwritten is pretty thin gruel" and that "he can't hold the audience's attention for any longer than on Vine, relying on his puppy-dog eyes and croon to get him through a song."

 Accolades 

Track listing

Personnel
Credits for Handwritten'' adapted from AllMusic.

 Blossom Berkofsky – photography
 Ziggy Chareton – A&R
 Chris Gehringer – mastering
 Teddy Geiger – composer
 Scott Harris – composer
 Jessica Kelly – design
 Daniel Kyriakides – composer
 David Massey – A&R
 Shawn Mendes – composer, vocals
 Daniel Parker – composer
 Andy Proctor – package production
 Gabrielle Rosen – A&R

 Todd Russell – art direction, design
 Glen Scott – composer
 Martin Terefe – composer
 Meredith Truax – photography
 Keith R. Tucker – A&R
 Josiah Vandien – photography
 Geoffrey Warburton – composer
 Emily Warren – composer
 Craven J – composer
 Ido Zmishlany – composer

Charts

Weekly charts

Year-end charts

Certifications

Release history

References

2015 debut albums
Shawn Mendes albums
Island Records albums
Albums recorded at Noble Street Studios